The Oki salamander (Hynobius okiensis) is a species of salamander in the family Hynobiidae, endemic to Japan. Its natural habitats are temperate forests, rivers, and plantations. It is threatened by habitat loss.

References

Hynobius
Endemic amphibians of Japan
Amphibians described in 1940
Taxonomy articles created by Polbot
Taxa named by Ikio Satō